In baseball statistics, a putout (denoted by PO or fly out when appropriate) is given to a defensive player who records an out by tagging a runner with the ball when he is not touching a base, catching a batted or thrown ball and tagging a base to put out a batter or runner (a force out), catching a thrown ball and tagging a base to record an out on an appeal play, catching a third strike (a strikeout), catching a batted ball on the fly (a flyout), or being positioned closest to a runner called out for interference. In baseball and softball, the second baseman is a fielding position in the infield, commonly stationed between second and first base. The second baseman often possesses quick hands and feet, needs the ability to get rid of the ball quickly, and must be able to make the pivot on a double play. In addition, second basemen are almost always right-handed. Only four left-handed throwing players have appeared as second basemen in the major leagues since 1950; one of the four, Gonzalo Márquez, was listed as the second baseman in the starting lineup for two games in 1973, batting in the first inning, but was replaced before his team took the field on defense, and none of the other three players lasted even a complete inning at the position. In the numbering system used to record defensive plays, the second baseman is assigned the number 4.

Putouts are most commonly recorded by second basemen by stepping on second base after receiving a throw from another infielder or the pitcher to force out a runner on a ground out, often beginning a double play; a second baseman generally benefits in this respect from playing alongside an excellent shortstop with great range and quickness. Other ways in which second basemen often record a putout include catching a pop-up or line drive, fielding a ground ball close enough to second base that they can step on the bag for a force out before the runner advances from first base, tagging a runner after a throw from the catcher or pitcher on a stolen base attempt or a pickoff play, receiving a throw from an outfielder to tag out a runner trying to stretch a single into a double, receiving a throw to retire a runner who fails to tag up on a fly ball out, receiving a throw to force out a runner on a bunt (possibly a sacrifice hit attempt), and tagging a runner stranded between bases in a rundown play. Sometimes a second baseman will record a putout while covering first base if the first baseman is charging toward the plate on an expected bunt. Occasionally, a second baseman can record two putouts on a single play; with a runner taking a lead off second base and less than two out, the second baseman can catch a line drive near the base, then step on the bag before the runner can return, completing a double play; alternately, if a runner on first base breaks for second base when the ball is hit, the second baseman can catch a line drive and tag the runner before they can stop and return to first. On five occasions in major league history, a second baseman has recorded three putouts on a single play for an unassisted triple play, always by catching a line drive, then stepping on second base and tagging the runner advancing from first base (one of the five tagged the runner before stepping on the bag). The first and most famous of these occurred in Game Five of the 1920 World Series, when Cleveland Indians second baseman Bill Wambsganss accomplished the feat in the fifth inning.

As strikeout totals have risen in baseball, the frequency of other defensive outs including ground outs has declined; as a result, putout totals for second basemen have likewise declined, and seven of the top eight career leaders began their careers prior to 1961. Through 2021, only five of the top 19 single-season totals have been recorded since 1936, only eight of the top 70 since 1962, and only two of the top 154 since 1980; only four of the top 500 have been recorded since 2000. Bid McPhee, who retired in 1899 and is the only second baseman ever to record 500 putouts in a season, is the all-time leader in career putouts as a second baseman with 6,552. Eddie Collins (6,526) and Nellie Fox (6,090) are the only other second basemen with over 6,000 career putouts.

Key

List

Stats updated through the 2022 season

Other Hall of Famers

Notes

References

External links

Major League Baseball statistics
Putouts as a second baseman